The Bradfield Scheme, a proposed Australian water diversion scheme, is an inland irrigation project that was designed to irrigate and drought-proof much of the western Queensland interior, as well as large areas of South Australia. It was devised by Dr John Bradfield (1867–1943), a Queensland born civil engineer, who also designed the Sydney Harbour Bridge and Brisbane's Story Bridge.

The scheme that Bradfield proposed in 1938 required large pipes, tunnels, pumps and dams. It involved diverting water from the upper reaches of the Tully, Herbert and Burdekin rivers.  These Queensland rivers are fed by the monsoon, and flow east to the Coral Sea. It was proposed that the water would enter the Thomson River on the western side of the Great Dividing Range and eventually flow south west to Lake Eyre. An alternative plan was to divert water into the Flinders River.

G. W. Leeper of the school of agricultural science at the University of Melbourne considered the plan to be lacking in scientific justification.

Possible benefits

The scheme would reduce the massive natural erosion problems in areas of Central Queensland. The scheme had the ability to generate  of power and the potential to double that amount.

It is claimed that extra water and vegetation in the interior may then produce changes to the climate of Australia, however various studies have concluded that this is unlikely. This may increase the rainfall in areas of southern Queensland and northern New South Wales. Extra rainfall may drought-proof Eastern Queensland, and thereby improve river inflows to the Murray-Darling River system. It is claimed that a full Lake Eyre would moderate the air temperature in the region by the absorption of sunlight by the water instead of heat radiation from dry land into the air. No evidence to support the theory that an inland sea would increase rainfall has ever been produced, nor have any of the other claims been supported. 

It would provide large areas suitable for the production of algae fuel, a type of biofuel.  The catchment area of the Herbert River holds a population of approximately 18,000, 75% of whom dwell in the lower flood plain area. Diverting some water from this river would reduce the risk of flood.

Objections
Bradfield's scheme and others have been criticised because they are not practical. This scheme has been criticised because of the high capital and ongoing running costs which would make the project uneconomical.

Elevation measurements were taken with a barometer, leading to inaccuracies in land heights and mistakes in the proposal. In most cases no flow record of the rivers were available to Bradfield. He used an empirical formula which assumed 33% of the water flow would be lost to evaporation and seepage.

The extreme evaporation rate in the interior is another negative determinant. No clear evidence has been provided that the amount of water supplied will exceed the evaporation rate. The reduction in river discharge to the Great Barrier Reef Lagoon may diminish coastal fisheries by reducing the supply of terrestrial organic matter to the coastal and estuarine environment.

In 1947, W.H.R. Nimmo conducted a critical review of the scheme.  He proved that Bradfield's estimates of the amount of water available from the easterly flowing rivers were about two and half times greater than it actually was.  The error was attributed to the methodology used to calculate flow estimates which was based on German rivers where the average temperature was much less than in northern Australia.

Support

The Bradfield Scheme has not received broad political support from any of the major Australian parties in recent times, but it has been pushed by individual politicians such as Bob Katter, who advocated the plan whilst he was a member of the Nationals for the state seat of Flinders during the 1980s, and continues to support it as an independent, representing the federal seat of Kennedy. In February 2007, the then Queensland Premier Peter Beattie urged the Federal Government to look at a modern version, saying it is better to find more water than to cut back on current supplies. However, Beattie preferred desalination.

In May 2019 former Nationals leader Barnaby Joyce and Pauline Hanson's One Nation party also support the scheme.

In November 2019 the Liberal National Party of Queensland, through the opposition leader Deb Frecklington, provided support of the project as a long term investment.

See also

Goldfields Water Supply Scheme
Irrigation in Australia
Ord River Irrigation Scheme
Great Man-Made River
Snowy Mountains Scheme

References

Engineering projects
Proposed interbasin transfer
Geography of Queensland
Water management in Queensland
Water supply and sanitation in Australia
North Queensland
Far North Queensland
Central West Queensland